Nebraska Highway 17 is a highway in southwestern Nebraska.  It has a southern terminus at the Kansas border south of Culbertson and a northern terminus in Culbertson at an intersection with U.S. Highway 6 and U.S. Highway 34.  The highway extends into Kansas at its southern terminus via K-117.

Route description
Nebraska Highway 17 begins at the Kansas state border, continuing from K-117.  It heads northward with some slight turns along the way.  There are no major intersections along its route.  It continues northward into Culbertson where it ends at an intersection with US 6 and US 34.

Major intersections

References

External links

The Nebraska Highways Page: Highways 1 to 30
Nebraska Roads: NE 11-20

017
Transportation in Hitchcock County, Nebraska